PAMP may refer to:
Pathogen-associated molecular pattern, molecules associated with groups of pathogens
PAMP (company), short for Produits Artistiques Métaux Précieux, a precious metals refining and fabricating company, subsidiary of the Swiss company MKS
pamp may mean pico amperes, pA, see Ampere
PAMP (phenylanisylmethylphosphine) is a precursor to the chemical compound DIPAMP